Georges Run is a  long 2nd order tributary to Chartiers Creek in Washington County, Pennsylvania.

Variant names
According to the Geographic Names Information System, it has also been known historically as:
Gorges Run

Course
George Run rises about 2.5 miles southwest of Westland, Pennsylvania, and then flows southeasterly to join Chartiers Creek in northwestern Washington.

Watershed
Georges Run drains  of area, receives about 39.4 in/year of precipitation, has a wetness index of 336.47, and is about 47% forested.

See also
 List of rivers of Pennsylvania

References

Rivers of Pennsylvania
Rivers of Washington County, Pennsylvania